Brazil is a 2000 album by Rosemary Clooney. John Pizzarelli accompanies Clooney on vocals on five of the tracks, and sings Antonio Carlos Jobim's "Wave". Diana Krall duets with Clooney on "The Boy from Ipanema". The arrangements primarily feature woodwinds (including several flutes, and saxophone soloist Gary Foster and Nino Tempo), piano and guitar, and do not feature brass instruments.

Track listing 
 "Brazil" (Ary Barroso, Bob Russell) – 6:52
 "Corcovado (Quiet Nights of Quiet Stars)" (Vinícius de Moraes, Gene Lees, Antônio Carlos Jobim) – 4:26
 "The Boy from Ipanema" (de Moraes, Norman Gimbel, Jobim) – 4:04
 "Wave" (Jobim) – 3:36
 "Once I Loved" (de Moraes, Ray Gilbert, Jobim) – 3:56
 "Desafinado" (de Moraes, Jon Hendricks) – 4:36
 "I Concentrate on You" (Cole Porter) – 2:34
 "One Note Samba" (Jon Hendricks, Jobim, Newton Mendonça) – 3:05
 "How Insensitive" (de Moraes, Gimbel, Jobim) – 2:38
 "Let Go" (Baden Powell de Aquino) – 3:07
 "Dindi" (Aloysio de Oliveria, Gilbert, Jobim) – 4:14
 "Waters of March (Aguas de Março)" (Jobim) – 3:14
 "Meditation" (Gimbel, Jobim, Mendonça) – 4:40
 "Sweet Happy Life" (Luiz Bonfá, Gimbel, Antonio Maria de Moraes, Andre Michel Salvet) – 4:58
 "A Day in the Life of a Fool" (Bonfá, Carl Sigman) – 3:19
 "Brazil (Reprise)" – 1:46

Personnel 
 Rosemary Clooney – vocals
 Diana Krall – piano, vocals
 Jeff Hamilton – drums
 Chauncey Welsch – trombone
 Oscar Castro-Neves – guitar
 Walfredo De Los Reyes Jr. – percussion
 George Graham – trumpet
 John Oddo – piano
 John Pizzarelli – guitar
 Chuck Berghofer – bass guitar
 Paulinho da Costa – percussion
 John Ferraro – drums
 Nino Tempo – tenor saxophone
 Gary Foster – alto saxophone
 Bob Summers – trumpet

References 

2000 albums
Rosemary Clooney albums
John Pizzarelli albums
Bossa nova albums
Concord Records albums